Adrian Lambert (born 26 April 1972 in Brighton) is an English bassist and songwriter who currently plays for thrash metal band Biomechanical and progressive rock band Son of Science.  Lambert also played bass in power metal band DragonForce from 2002–2006.

Gear
Lambert currently uses Ibanez SoundGear six string basses.  He currently uses the Ibanez SR 1006EFM Prestige in natural flat and the SR506 in black.  Lambert also uses the Sansamp bass driver DI.

Achievements
Lambert has recorded 3 full-length albums.  Notable tours include opening for Iron Maiden on the European leg of their Eddie Rips Up the World Tour 2005.  Notable festivals include main stage performances at Wacken Open Air, Bloodstock Open Air and Graspop.  Lambert signed an artist endorsement deal with Ibanez in 2005.

Performances
Lambert is best known for his very fast playing style utilising a three-fingered picking technique with a six string bass. This fast picking technique was essential during his time in DragonForce to be able to play at the high tempos that the band is known for. He is also known for playing guitar style solos on the bass and for using slap and pop and two-handed tapping techniques.

Discography

With Intense
2004: Second Sight

With DragonForce
2004: Sonic Firestorm
2006: Inhuman Rampage

References

External links

 Official Son of Science website

DragonForce members
English heavy metal bass guitarists
Male bass guitarists
English songwriters
1972 births
Living people
21st-century English bass guitarists